Gerald's Game is a 2017 American psychological horror thriller film directed and edited by Mike Flanagan, and screenplay written by Flanagan with Jeff Howard. It is based on Stephen King's 1992 novel of the same title, long thought to be unfilmable. The film stars Carla Gugino and Bruce Greenwood as a married couple who arrive at an isolated house for a holiday. When the husband dies of a sudden heart attack, his wife, left handcuffed to the bed without the key and with little hope of rescue, must find a way to survive, all while battling her inner demons.

Gerald's Game had its world premiere at BFI Southbank on September 19, 2017, and was released on September 29, 2017, by Netflix. It received very positive reviews from critics, who lauded Gugino's performance; Flanagan's direction, and the film's themes and their treatment, were also singled out.

Plot
Jessie and Gerald Burlingame arrive at an isolated lake house in Fairhope, Alabama for a romantic getaway. While Gerald takes Viagra, Jessie feeds raw beef to a stray dog outside. Inside, she changes into a new slip and Gerald restrains her with a set of handcuffs locked to the bedposts. He begins to enact a stranger rape fantasy; she half-heartedly plays along but soon becomes uncomfortable, telling him to stop and uncuff her. After a heated argument in which he accuses her of not even trying to rekindle their relationship, Gerald dies of a heart attack, falling onto the floor and leaving Jessie trapped in the handcuffs.

A few hours pass. The dog enters through the open door of the house. Jessie tries to scare it away, but it bites a chunk out of Gerald's arm and eats it. Gerald stands up and begins talking; when Jessie notices his body remains on the floor, she realizes she is hallucinating. He taunts her about the truths of their strained marriage and his erectile dysfunction. He then informs her that she is beginning to suffer from dehydration and fatigue. Jessie also hallucinates a more self-assured version of herself, who explains things about her and Gerald that she never had the courage to acknowledge. The two hallucinations trigger her to remember the glass of water Gerald had left on the shelf above the bed, which she is able to reach; when she can't drink it, she rolls the shopping tag she'd torn from her slip into a drinking straw to reach the water.

Jessie falls asleep, wakes up in the dark, and sees a deformed obscured figure who reveals a bag of bones and trinkets. She refuses to believe the figure is real but Gerald says the figure is Death waiting to take her. Gerald begins to call Jessie "Mouse", which triggers a memory of her father Tom, who affectionately referred to her as "Mouse." When she was 12, he had her sit on his lap while he masturbated to her during a solar eclipse. Gerald and Jessie number 2 taunt that she never recovered from the assault, and that she married a man just like her father. Gerald calls the deformed man "the man made of moonlight", and points out a bloody footprint on the floor, making Jessie realize the figure may have been real.

Jessie remembers how her mother suspected her father but did nothing. She smashes the water glass, cuts her wrist, and peels back the skin, allowing her bloody hand to slip through the cuff. She is then able to reach the key and unlock her other hand. She bandages her wrist but passes out from blood loss and fatigue. When she awakes, the "man made of moonlight" is at the end of the hall. Delirious, she removes her wedding ring and gives it to him for his trinket bag before leaving. She makes it to her car and drives away but hallucinates the deformed figure again and crashes into a tree. People from a nearby house emerge to help.

Six months later, Jessie is writing a letter to her 12-year-old self. She describes how she had pretended to have amnesia over the ordeal of being trapped, avoiding painful questions. She used some of Gerald's life insurance to start a foundation for victims of sexual abuse. But each night the "man made of moonlight" still appears before her as she falls asleep. She learned from the news about a serial killer with acromegaly who digs up crypts, stealing bones and jewels, and has sex with and eats the faces of male corpses; this explains why he didn't harm Jessie in the house and why Gerald's face was disfigured.

Jessie arrives at court as the moonlight man is being sentenced. He quotes what she said before leaving the house, indicating that he was in fact there at the time. Seeing Gerald and her father in him, she tells him, "You're so much smaller than I remember", and leaves triumphantly.

Cast 
 Carla Gugino as Jessie Burlingame
 Chiara Aurelia as "Mouse" (Young Jessie)
 Bruce Greenwood as Gerald Burlingame, Jessie's husband
 Carel Struycken as "Moonlight Man" / Raymond Andrew Joubert
 Henry Thomas as Tom, Jessie's father
 Kate Siegel as Sally, Jessie's mother
 Adalyn Jones as Maddie, Jessie's sister
 Bryce Harper as James, Jessie's brother

Production

Development
On May 19, 2014, Deadline Hollywood reported that Mike Flanagan had been set to direct a film adaptation of Stephen King's suspense thriller novel Gerald's Game, scripted by Jeff Howard. Trevor Macy produced the film through Intrepid Pictures.

In an interview with Rue Morgue in September 2016, Flanagan stated that the film adaptation would be released by Netflix.

Casting
Carla Gugino and Bruce Greenwood were cast to play Jessie and Gerald Burlingame, along with Henry Thomas, Carel Struycken, Kate Siegel, and Chiara Aurelia.

Filming
Principal photography on the film began on October 17, 2016, in Mobile, Alabama.

Release
The film was released on September 29, 2017, by Netflix. It has not been announced for a physical DVD or Bluray release.

Critical reception
Gerald's Game received positive reviews. On review aggregator site Rotten Tomatoes, the film holds an approval rating of 91% based on 79 reviews, with an average rating of 7.60/10. The website's critics consensus states, "Carla Gugino carries Gerald's Game small-scale suspense with a career-defining performance." At Metacritic, which uses a weighted average, the film has a score of 77 out of 100 based on 12 critics, indicating "generally favorable reviews." Stephen King called the film "hypnotic, horrifying and terrific" after watching the rough cut.

See also 

List of films featuring eclipses

References

External links 
 
 

2017 films
2017 horror thriller films
2017 psychological thriller films
2010s English-language films
2010s erotic thriller films
2010s feminist films
2010s psychological horror films
2010s American films
American erotic horror films
American erotic thriller films
American feminist films
American horror thriller films
American psychological horror films
American psychological thriller films
English-language Netflix original films
Films about child sexual abuse
Films based on American horror novels
Films based on American thriller novels
Films based on works by Stephen King
Films directed by Mike Flanagan
Films scored by the Newton Brothers
Films shot in Mobile, Alabama
Incest in film
Intrepid Pictures films